The Long Shadow is a 1961 British second feature, a drama film directed by Peter Maxwell and starring John Crawford, Susan Hampshire and Willoughby Goddard. It was filmed at Pinewood Studios.

Plot summary
In Vienna during the Cold War, the Russians and Americans try to gain control of a boy who can be manipulated for political purposes. An American newspaper journalist attempts to save the Hungarian child and a Swedish nurse from certain death.

Cast
 John Crawford as Kelly 
 Susan Hampshire as Gunilla 
 Willoughby Goddard as Schober 
 Humphrey Lestocq as Bannister 
 Rory O'Brine as Ruchi Korbanyi 
 Anne Castaldini as Magda 
 Margaret Robertson as Mother 
 Bill Nagy as Garity  
 Lily Kann as Old Lady
  Hana-Maria Pravda as Matron	
  Gisele Burke as Lisel	
  Sean Sullivan as Burgen

References

External links

1961 films
1961 drama films
British drama films
1960s English-language films
Films directed by Peter Maxwell
Films shot at Pinewood Studios
Films set in Vienna
Cold War films
1960s British films